Dany Chamoun (26 August 1934 – 21 October 1990) was a prominent Lebanese politician.  A Maronite Christian, the younger son of former President Camille Chamoun and brother of Dory Chamoun, Chamoun was also a politician in his own right.

Biography

Early life and education
Chamoun was born in Deir el-Qamar on 26 August 1934. He was the younger son of the former President Camille Chamoun. He studied civil engineering in the United Kingdom at Loughborough University

Political career

Chamoun reported that he had not had any interest in politics before the Lebanon civil war. He became the National Liberal Party Secretary of Defense in January 1976, after the death of its predecessor Naim Berdkan. As Supreme Commander of the NLP's military wing, the Tigers, he also played a major role in the early years of the Lebanese Civil War.

By 1980, the Phalangist-dominated Lebanese Forces were under the command of Bachir Gemayel. The Tigers were eliminated as a military force in a surprise attack by Gemayel’s militia on 7 July 1980.

Chamoun's life was spared, and he fled to the Sunni Muslim-dominated West Beirut. He then went into self-imposed exile.

He served as General Secretary of the National Liberal Party from 1983 to 1985, when he replaced his father as the party leader. In 1988, he became President of the revived Lebanese Front—a coalition of nationalist and mainly Christian parties and politicians that his father had helped to found. The same year, he announced his candidacy for the Presidency of Lebanon to succeed Amine Gemayel (Bashir's brother), but Syria (which by this time occupied some 70 percent of Lebanese territory) vetoed his candidacy.

Gemayel's term expired on 23 September 1988 without the election of a successor. Chamoun declared his strong support for Michel Aoun, who had been appointed by the outgoing president to lead an interim administration and went on to lead one of two rival governments that contended for power over the next two years. He strongly opposed the Taif Agreement, which not only gave a greater share of power to the Muslim community than they had enjoyed previously, but more seriously, in Chamoun's opinion, formalized what he saw as the master-servant relationship between Syria and Lebanon, and refused to recognize the new government of the President Elias Hrawi, who was elected under the Taif Agreement.

Death
On 21 October 1990, Chamoun, along with his second wife Ingrid Abdelnour (forty-five), and his two sons, Tarek (seven) and Julian (five), were killed when the Lebanese Forces attacked their home. On 24 June 1995, the Lebanese Tribunal found Samir Geagea guilty of the murder of Dany Chamoun and his family. He was sentenced to death commuted to life in prison with hard labour. Co-defendants Camille Karam and Rafic Saadeh were sentenced to ten and one year respectively. Ten other members of the Lebanese Forces were sentenced to life in absentia. The case was based entirely on circumstantial evidence and the trial was described by Amnesty International as seriously flawed. Geagea remained on trial for the Saydet al-Najat Church bombing.  The verdict was rejected by a part of the Lebanese public opinion and by Dany's brother, Dori Chamoun, who declared that the Syrian occupation army was responsible for the massacre. Geagea was released as a part of a joint goodwill national reconciliation policy, after the Syrian departure.

See also
 List of assassinated Lebanese politicians
 List of attacks in Lebanon
 Tracy Chamoun

References

External links
Jean-Marc Aractingi, La politique à mes trousses, éditions L'Harmattan, Paris, 2006.

1934 births
1990 deaths
People from Chouf District
Lebanese Maronites
Assassinated Lebanese politicians
Deaths by firearm in Lebanon
Warlords
People murdered in Lebanon
National Liberal Party (Lebanon) politicians
Terrorism deaths in Lebanon
People of the Lebanese Civil War
Children of national leaders
Chamoun family
Candidates for President of Lebanon
Lebanese anti-communists